Miriam (Miki) Gasko Donoho (also published as Miriam Gasko-Green) is an American statistician whose research topics have included data visualization, equivalences between binary regression and survival analysis, and robust regression.

Education and career
Gasko completed her Ph.D. in statistics at Harvard University in 1981. Her dissertation was Testing Sequentially Selected Outliers from Linear Models. She became a professor of marketing and quantitative studies in the College of Business at San Jose State University, director of the Silicon Valley Consumer Confidence Survey, and treasurer of the Institute of Mathematical Statistics.

Recognition
She is a Fellow of the Institute of Mathematical Statistics.
MacSpin, a program for three-dimensional data visualization that she developed with her husband David Donoho and brother-in-law Andrew Donoho, was named as the best scientific/engineering software of 1987 by MacUser magazine.

Selected publications

References

Year of birth missing (living people)
Living people
20th-century American mathematicians
21st-century American mathematicians
American women statisticians
Fellows of the Institute of Mathematical Statistics
Harvard Graduate School of Arts and Sciences alumni
San Jose State University faculty
20th-century American women
21st-century American women